Deuterium-depleted water (DDW) is water which has a lower concentration of deuterium than occurs naturally at sea level on Earth.

DDW is sometimes known as light water, although "light water" has long referred to ordinary water, specifically in nuclear reactors.

Chemistry
Deuterium-depleted water has a lower concentration of deuterium (2H) than occurs in nature at sea level. Deuterium is a naturally-occurring, stable (non-radioactive) isotope of hydrogen with a nucleus consisting of one proton and one neutron. The nucleus of ordinary hydrogen (protium) consists of one proton only, and no neutron. Deuterium atoms have about twice the atomic mass of normal hydrogen atoms as a result. Heavy water consists of water molecules with two deuterium atoms instead of the two normal hydrogen atoms. The hydrogen in normal water consists of about 99.98% (by weight) of normal hydrogen (1H).

The production of heavy water involves isolating and removing deuterium-containing isotopologues within natural water. The by-product of this process is deuterium-depleted water.

Due to the heterogeneity of hydrological conditions, the isotopic composition of natural water varies around the Earth. Distance from the ocean and the equator and the height above sea level have a positive correlation with water deuterium depletion.

In Vienna Standard Mean Ocean Water (VSMOW) that defines the isotopic composition of the ocean water, deuterium occurs at a concentration of 155.76 ppm. For the SLAP (Standard Light Antarctic Precipitation) standard that determines the isotopic composition of natural water from the Antarctic, the concentration of deuterium is 89.02 ppm.

Snow water, especially from glacial mountain meltwater, is significantly lighter than ocean water. The weight quantities of isotopologues in natural water are calculated on the basis of the data collected using molecular spectroscopy:

According to the table above, the weight concentration of heavy isotopologues in natural water can reach 2.97 g/kg, which is mostly due to 1H218O, i.e. water with light hydrogen and heavy oxygen. Furthermore, there are about 300 milligrams of deuterium-containing isotopologues in each liter of water. This presents a significant value comparable, for example, with the content of mineral salts.

Biological properties of the deuterium content in water

Gilbert N. Lewis was the first to discover that heavy water inhibits (retards) seed growth (1933). His experiments with tobacco seeds showed that cultivation of cells on heavy water dramatically accelerates the aging process and leads to lethal results.

Production

Deuterium-depleted water can be produced in laboratories and factories. Various technologies are used for its production, such as electrolysis, distillation (low-temperature vacuum rectification), desalination from seawater, Girdler sulfide process, and catalytic exchange.

Health claims and critiсism

Harriet Hall investigated health claims being attributed to drinking DDW, which has been sold for as much as $20 per liter. In a July 2020 article published at Skeptical Inquirer online, she reported that the overwhelming majority of DDW studies, despite showing positive outcomes, did not involve humans, and the few that did, did not verify any human efficacy.

See also
 Kinetic isotope effect
 Light water (disambiguation)
 Properties of water

References

Water
Water chemistry
Medical physics
Alternative cancer treatments
Isotopes